Joseph Paul Horgan (born June 7, 1977) is a former Major League Baseball pitcher.

Career
Horgan was born in Sacramento, California.  He played at Sacramento City College and graduated from Cordova High School.

He appeared in 47 games for the Montreal Expos in the  season as a relief pitcher and had a record of 4–1 with an ERA of 3.15. He briefly played for the Washington Nationals during the  season. He played his final season for the Triple-A Albuquerque Isotopes of the Pacific Coast League.

External links

Joe Horgan at Baseball Almanac
Pelota Binaria (Venezuelan Winter League)

1977 births
Living people
Albuquerque Isotopes players
American expatriate baseball players in Canada
Bakersfield Blaze players
Baseball players from Sacramento, California
Burlington Indians players (1986–2006)
Caribes de Oriente players
American expatriate baseball players in Venezuela
Columbus RedStixx players
Edmonton Trappers players
Fresno Grizzlies players
Kinston Indians players
Major League Baseball pitchers
Memphis Redbirds players
Montreal Expos players
New Orleans Zephyrs players
Pastora de los Llanos players
Sacramento City Panthers baseball players
San Jose Giants players
Shreveport Captains players
Shreveport Swamp Dragons players
Tigres del Licey players
American expatriate baseball players in the Dominican Republic
Tomateros de Culiacán players
American expatriate baseball players in Mexico
Washington Nationals players
Watertown Indians players